The Hotel Lesage is a historic hotel building located at 101 Main Street in Colfax, Louisiana, facing west toward the Red River (Louisiana).

Built by Joseph Victor Lesage in 1902, the structure is a two-story masonry commercial style building. It was used as a hotel, a restaurant and also housed a separate store. Despite some alterations to the first floor, the building retains its original appearance.

The hotel was listed on the National Register of Historic Places on January 26, 2016.

See also
National Register of Historic Places listings in Grant Parish, Louisiana

References

−
National Register of Historic Places in Louisiana
Hotel buildings completed in 1902
Grant Parish, Louisiana